The Belgian State Railways Type 25 was a class of  steam locomotives for freight service, introduced in 1884.

Construction history
The locomotives were built by various manufacturers from 1884 to 1898.
The machines had an outside frame with the cylinders and the Walschaert valve gear located inside the frame.

References

Bibliography

0-6-0 locomotives
Steam locomotives of Belgium
Standard gauge locomotives of Belgium
C n2 locomotives
Railway locomotives introduced in 1884
Cockerill locomotives
Franco-Belge locomotives